The Guangdong International Building or Guangdong International Hotel is a 63-storey,  skyscraper in Guangzhou, China. The tower was designed by Rong Baisheng of the Guangdong Provincial Architectural Design and Research Institute in 1985. When completed in 1990, it was the tallest building in China and the first 200-metre skyscraper in the country.

See also
 List of tallest buildings in Guangzhou

References

Skyscraper office buildings in Guangzhou
Buildings and structures completed in 1990
1990 establishments in China
Skyscraper hotels in Guangzhou
Skyscrapers in Guangzhou